Choynimni (also spelled Choinumne) is a dialect of Kings River Yokuts historically spoken along the Kings River between Sanger and Mill Creek (near Piedra). The language is the best documented dialect of Kings River Yokuts.

Information on the language was collected by Clinton Hart Merriam and Stanley Newman.

Fluent speakers 
Jennie Irene Oliver, one of the last fully fluent speaker of Choynimni died in 2022 at the age of 83. Living members of the tribe retain knowledge of Choynimni including an estimated half dozen speakers.

Revitalization effort 
Efforts to revitalize the language have been organized through the California State University, Fresno Department of Linguistics.

References 

Endangered Yokutsan languages